Instant Winner is the second album by Distorted Pony, released in 1994 through Trance Syndicate. By the time of the album's release, the band had already parted ways the previous year.

The Dallas Observer called the album "impossible to listen to in its entirety."

Track listing

Personnel 
Distorted Pony
Robert Hammer – guitar
Theodore Jackson – drums, percussion
Dora Jahr – bass guitar, vocals
London May – drums
David Uskovich – guitar, vocals
Production and additional personnel
Steve Albini – engineering
Distorted Pony – production

References

External links 
 

1994 albums
Distorted Pony albums
Trance Syndicate albums